Stephen Keith Adlard (23 October 1950 – 18 September 2018) was an English footballer and first-class cricketer.

Life 
Adlard played professional football for several seasons in England, as a goalkeeper. He was a member of the Nottingham Forest (first division) and Lincoln City (fourth division) teams, but never played at first-team level. As a cricketer, he played one match for Lincolnshire against Derbyshire in the 1976 Gillette Cup and played in the Minor Counties Championship from 1975 to 1980.

From 1982 to 1986 Adlard was an assistant coach for the University of Evansville soccer team. From 1986 to 1988 he was the head coach of Davis and Elkins and then moved on to become director of soccer at UNC-Asheville from 1988 to 1991. During the same time, 1988–1991, he was the head coach of the 1972 classic division of the USYSA, The Asheville Highlanders. From 1991 to November 2005 he was the head coach at Marquette University.

References

External links
 Profile at CricketArchive
 Profile and photo at Marquette U. Athletic Site

1950 births
2018 deaths
English cricketers
English footballers
Lincolnshire cricketers
English expatriate sportspeople in the United States
English expatriates in the United States
Evansville Purple Aces men's soccer coaches
Association football goalkeepers
Lincoln City F.C. players
Marquette Golden Eagles men's soccer coaches
Nottingham Forest F.C. players
Cricketers from Lincoln, England
Davis & Elkins Senators men's soccer coaches